The 2005 Africa Cup (Official name "Top 9") was the 6th edition of the continental rugby union tournament arranged by Confederation of African Rugby (CAR).

It was won by Morocco, that defeated Madagascar in the final.

The final was played at the "Stade de France" before the match between France and South Africa match of the 2005 South Africa rugby union tour of Argentina and Europe. The match was arranged in that venue, due to participation of South African Amateurs selection, who were surprisingly defeated in the semifinal by Madagascar.

Division 1 (Africa Cup)

First round

Pool A 

 Three point for victory, two for draw, and one for lost 
{| class="wikitable"
|-
!width=165|Team
!width=40|Played
!width=40|Won
!width=40|Drawn
!width=40|Lost
!width=40|For
!width=40|Against
!width=40|Difference
!width=40|Pts
|- bgcolor=#ccffcc align=center
|align=left|
|2||2||0||0||145||39||+ 106||6
|- align=center
|align=left| 
|2||1||0||1||42||52||- 10||4
|- align=center
|align=left| 
|2||0||0||2||15||111||- 96||2
|}

Pool B 

 Three point for victory, two for draw, and one for lost 
{| class="wikitable"
|-
!width=165|Team
!width=40|Played
!width=40|Won
!width=40|Drawn
!width=40|Lost
!width=40|For
!width=40|Against
!width=40|Difference
!width=40|Pts
|- bgcolor=#ccffcc align=center
|align=left|
|2||2||0||0||61||17||+ 44||6
|- bgcolor=#ccffcc align=center
|align=left| 
|2||1||0||1||47||65||- 18||4
|- align=center
|align=left| 
|1||0||0||1||10||36||- 26||1
|}

Pool C 

 Three point for victory, two for draw, and one for lost 
{| class="wikitable"
|-
!width=165|Team
!width=40|Played
!width=40|Won
!width=40|Drawn
!width=40|Lost
!width=40|For
!width=40|Against
!width=40|Difference
!width=40|Pts
|- bgcolor=#ccffcc align=center
|align=left|
|2||2||0||0||29||6||+ 23||6
|- align=center
|align=left| 
|2||1||0||1||40||34||+6||4
|- align=center
|align=left| 
|2||0||0||2||18||27||- 29||2
|}

Knockout stage

Semifinals

Final

Division 2

External links
Rugby : le Maroc champion d’Afrique - aujourdhui.ma

2005
2004 rugby union tournaments for national teams
2005 in African rugby union